The City of Auckland by-election 1858 was a by-election held in the  electorate during the 2nd New Zealand Parliament, on 27 April 1858.

The by-election was caused by the resignation of incumbent MP John Campbell and was won by Thomas Forsaith on a show of hands.

References

Auckland 1858
1858 elections in New Zealand
April 1858 events
Politics of the Auckland Region
1850s in Auckland